The 49th Women's Boat Race took place on 20 March 1994. The contest was between crews from the Universities of Oxford and Cambridge and held as part of the Henley Boat Races along a two-kilometre course.

Background
The first Women's Boat Race was conducted on The Isis in 1927.

Race
Cambridge won by one length in a time of 6 minutes 11 seconds.

References

External links
 Official website

Women's Boat Race
1994 in English sport
Boat
March 1994 sports events in the United Kingdom
1994 in women's rowing
1994 sports events in London